The 2020 Diamond League was the eleventh season of the annual series of outdoor track and field meetings, organised by World Athletics. The competition marked the first major revision to the top level athletics series since its foundation in 2010. The number of Diamond Discipline events was reduced from 32 to 24, and the dual-meet final format was due to be replaced by a single final, which would have expanded the number of meetings to 15. A second Chinese meeting was added to the calendar. The reduction of events was aimed at allowing a standardised 90-minute television format for the series. Each meeting will host 11 or 12 Diamond Discipline events and some of these events will not be broadcast. Events losing Diamond Discipline status will feature on the World Athletics Continental Tour, which will replace the IAAF World Challenge as the second tier of track and field meetings.

Compared with the previous year, the Birmingham meeting moved venues to Gateshead due to stadium renovations, while the Prefontaine Classic was due to return to Eugene, Oregon following completion of its renovation. The Doha Diamond League will also return to the Qatar Sports Club, the home of the Qatari Diamond League between 2010 and 2018. The Golden Gala was originally due be held at the San Paolo Stadium in Naples instead of Rome, due to the renovation of the Olympic Stadium. Initial plans for the 2020 season were to remove the Stockholm Bauhaus Athletics from the series and condense the calendar into a much shorter time-frame, but these plans were abandoned after a five-year title sponsorship deal with Chinese conglomerate Wanda Group.

Due to then ongoing COVID-19 pandemic, the format was changed. The series will no longer be a structured series of events leading up to a final and athletes will not earn Diamond League points.

Schedule

The following nine meetings are scheduled to be included in the 2020 season (note: schedule was revised due to the pandemic and meetings in London, Eugene, Paris, Rabat, Gateshead and Shanghai were cancelled:

() = Event was modified to no-spectator multi-place interactive event.

Men

Track

Field

Women

Track

Field

References

External links

Official website

 
Diamond League
Diamond League